Thomas John Grainge (1865 - 4 January 1944) was an organist and composer based in England.

Life

He was born in 1865, the son of James Grainge and Mary Couling of Abingdon. He was baptised in St. Ebbe's Church on 15 January 1865.

He studied music at Queen's College, Oxford.

He married Katharine Lillingston.

Appointments

Organist of St. Mary's Church, Woodstock 1884 - 1892 
Organist of St Mary the Virgin, Acocks Green, Birmingham 1892 - 1894
Organist of All Saints' Church, Cheltenham 1894 - 1935

Compositions

His compositions include music for choir and organ.

References

1865 births
1944 deaths
English organists
British male organists
English composers
Alumni of The Queen's College, Oxford